Events from the year 1932 in Romania. The year saw the birth of two future Woman Grandmasters, Maria Albuleț and Margareta Teodorescu.

Incumbents
 King: Carol II. 
 Prime Minister:

Nicolae Iorga (Until 6 June)
Alexandru Vaida-Voevod (Between 6 June and 19 October)
Iuliu Maniu (from 20 October)

Events
 25 March – The far-right National Socialist Party (PNSR) is founded by Gheorghe Tătărescu.
 26 March – The Iron Guard is declared illegal.
 1 April – Cluj Airport is founded by the by the Romanian Ministry of Industry and Trade.
 29 April – Carol II institutes the National Order of Faithful Service as an order and decoration.
 25 May – The Albanian Nationalistic newspaper Kosova is first published in Bucharest.
 18 June –The Romanian Basketball Federation is one of the founders of the Fédération Internationale de Basket-Ball Amateur, which later becomes the International Basketball Federation (FIBA).
 1 July – Petru Comarnescu convenes the first meeting of the Criterion learned society.
 17 July – In the general election, the governing National Peasants' Party-German Party alliance wins 274 of the 387 seats in the Chamber of Deputies.
 Unknown – The aviation company Întreprinderea de Construcții Aeronautice Românești is founded.

Births
 12 April – Florin-Teodor Tănăsescu, electrical engineer.
 13 April – Margareta Teodorescu, chess player, Woman Grandmaster in 1985 (died 2013).
 15 April – Lia Manoliu, discus thrower, winner of gold at the 1968 Summer Olympics and bronze at the 1960 and 1964 games (died 1998).
 24 April – Florin Pucă, graphic designer (died 1990).
 10 June – Maria Albuleț, chess player, Woman Grandmaster in 1985 (died 2005).
 9 July – Tatiana Nicolescu, historian of Romanian and Russian literature and translator.
 19 July – Alexandru Moșanu, first President of the Parliament of Republic of Moldova and co-author of the Moldovan Declaration of Independence (died 2017).
 1 October – Ioan-Iovitz Popescu, physicist and linguist, member of the Romanian Academy.
 2 October – Valentin Poénaru, mathematician.

Deaths
 6 January – Iacob Negruzzi, poet (born 1842).
 11 June – Maria Chefaliady-Taban, composer and pianist (born 1863).
 14 June – Nicolae Vermont, graphic artist and muralist (born 1884).
 14 July – Dimitrie Paciurea, sculptor (born 1873 or 1875).
 15 August – Traian Moșoiu, general during World War I and the Hungarian–Romanian War, Minister of War in 1919–1920 (born 1868).

References

Years of the 20th century in Romania
1930s in Romania
 
Romania
Romania